The 2002 NBDL Draft was held on October 31, 2002. One hundred twelve picks were made over fourteen rounds.

Draft

References

NBA G League draft
Draft
National Basketball Association lists
National Basketball Development League draft